The Berezayka is a river in Valdaysky District of Novgorod Oblast and Bologovsky District of Tver Oblast of Russia. It is left tributary of the Msta and belongs to the drainage basin of the Neva and the Baltic Sea. The principal tributary of the Berezayka is the Valdayka (left).

The course of Berezayka lies in the Valdai Hills. The source of the river is in Lake Berezay. The Berezayka flows north, empties into Lake Kholmskoye, and flows out of this lake to the east. It enters Tver Oblast, flows through a number of lakes, and turns north. It flows through the southeastern part of Lake Piros and turns east. The mouth of the Berezayka is at the village of Berezovsky Ryadok.

The drainage basin of the Berezayka includes the major parts of Valdaysky and Bologovsky Districts, as well as minor areas at Okulovsky and Borovichsky Districts of Novgorod Oblast and the urban-type settlement of Ozyorny in Tver Oblast. The towns of Bologoye and Valday lie in the basin of the Berezayka. The basin also includes many lakes of the Valdai Hills, the biggest of which are Lake Valdayskoye, Lake Kaftino, and Lake Piros.

The Berezayka is a popular rafting route.

References

Rivers of Novgorod Oblast
Rivers of Tver Oblast